Nilothi is a village near Nangloi Jat on National Highway-10, Delhi.

Notable persons 

Chaudhary Bharat Singh (Death: 19 April, 2008), ex M.P. Outer Delhi (Lok Sabha constituency) (1984-89).

Manoj Kumar Shokeen Ex MLA Nangloi Jat (Vidhan Sabha constituency)

Babeena pawanjeet shokeen [mcd councillor]

Jeet Shokeen [district spokeperson bjp delhi]

Villages in West Delhi district

Deepanshu Shokeen [Ex-President Igipess,university of delhi]